A Night of Triumph is a concert video first released to VHS and LaserDisc, later released as a live album and DVD by the Canadian hard rock band Triumph. The concert was recorded on January 16, 1987, at the Halifax Metro Centre in Nova Scotia during Triumph's Sport of Kings tour. The DVD bonus features included backstage footage from a Triumph concert at Wachovia Spectrum in Philadelphia. Also included is the video for "Just One Night" and a live performance of "When the Lights Go Down" from the band's appearance at the 1983 US Festival, which itself was previously released as a standalone DVD in 2003 called Live at the US Festival.

Set list
 "Intro"
 "Tears in the Rain"
 "Somebody's Out There"
 "Allied Forces"
 "Lay it on the Line"
 "Midsummer's Daydream"
 "Follow Your Heart"
 "Take a Stand" (with Gil Moore drum solo)
 "Magic Power"
 "Rock and Roll Machine"
 "Spellbound"
 "Rocky Mountain Way"
 "Fight the Good Fight"

Personnel
 Rik Emmett – guitar, lead vocals
 Gil Moore – drums, percussion, lead vocals
 Mike Levine – bass guitar, keyboards, backing vocals
 Rick Santers – keyboards, guitar, backing vocals

Details
DTS 5.1 Surround
Dolby Digital 5.1 Surround
Dolby Digital 2.0 Stereo
Colour
Digitally processed
DTS Sound
1.33:1 – full frame

Certifications

External links
 A Night of Triumph at CD Universe

References

Triumph (band) albums
Albums produced by Mike Levine (musician)
2004 live albums